Speed to Burn is a 1938 American crime drama film, directed by Otto Brower and starring Michael Whalen, Lynn Bari, and Marvin Stephens.

Plot

Cast
 Michael Whalen as Matt Kerry
 Lynn Bari as Marion Clark
 Marvin Stephens as Tim Turner
 Henry Armetta as Papa Gambini
 Chick Chandler as Sport Fields
 Sidney Blackmer as Hastings

References

External links
Speed to Burn at the Internet Movie Database
 Full plot synopsis

1938 films
American horse racing films
American crime drama films
1938 crime drama films
Films directed by Otto Brower
American black-and-white films
20th Century Fox films
1930s American films